Newellton is a town in northern Tensas Parish in the northeastern part of the U.S. state of Louisiana. The population is 1,187 in the 2010 census, a decline of 255 persons, or 17 percent, from the 2000 tabulation of 1,482. The average age of the population there is 41 years.

Newellton is west of the Mississippi River on Lake St. Joseph, an ox-bow lake. Further south toward St. Joseph, the parish seat of government, is another ox-bow lake, Lake Bruin, a part of which is the popular Lake Bruin State Park.

History
Newellton itself was founded in the early 19th century by the Routh family, for whom the defunct Routhwood Elementary School was named. John David Stokes Newell Sr., a planter and lawyer in St. Joseph, the seat of Tensas Parish, named the settlement for his father, Edward, a native of North Carolina who relocated to Tensas Parish in 1834.

Newellton was designated a village in 1904. On April 4, 1951, under Mayor T. T. Hargrove, Newellton was upgraded to a town through the state Lawrason Act.

In March 2014, Newellton became debt-free.

Political matters
In 2012, the former Newellton mayor, Democrat Alex Davis (born 1942), did not seek a fourth term. The first African American in the position, Davis unseated the 34-year incumbent Edwin G. Preis Sr., a white businessman, in the nonpartisan blanket primary held on October 7, 2000. Davis received 366 votes (56.8 percent) to Preis' 184 (28.6 percent), and Floyd Aaron "Coonie" McVay's 94 votes (14.6 percent). A native of Oak Grove in West Carroll Parish, McVay was formerly the Newellton police chief. He died in 2012 at the age of eighty.

The current mayor is the African-American Democrat Timothy Durell Turner, the former District 1 alderman, who won the election held on December 8, 2012, by a single vote, 217-216, over the Republican candidate, James Carroll Fuller Sr. (1936-2021), the former District 5 alderman. Fuller, who is white, is a former resident of Braxton, Mississippi, and Denham Springs, Louisiana. Fuller had led Turner, 259 (44.7 percent) to 207 (35.8 percent), in the higher-turnout primary election held on November 6, with another 113 votes (19.5 percent) then cast for a second Democrat, Knola Ransome.

In 2016, Fuller again challenged Turner and once again lost by one vote, 210 for Fuller and 211 for Turner.

Fuller earlier was among 582 Louisiana elected officials named to former Governor Bobby Jindal's "Kitchen Cabinet Leadership Team". Two other Tensas Parish officials appointed to the panel were Assessor Irby Gamble and Coroner Keith D. Butler, both of St. Joseph.

The Newellton police chief, Johnny Gales (1951-2021), a Democrat, was reelected in 2012. There are five municipal alderman, one of whom, Lavone G. Garner from District 5, is a Republican. She was elected to succeed Carroll Fuller, who left the council with his first race for mayor. 
 
, there were four police officers and Chief Gales in Newellton, with two marked cars and one unmarked, and eighteen volunteer firefighters. The town clerk is Rhonda King (born 1953).

Geography
Newellton is located at  (32.072740, -91.239230).

Demographics

2020 census

As of the 2020 United States census, there were 886 people, 403 households, and 245 families residing in the town.

2000 census
As of the census of 2000, there were 1,482 people, 536 households, and 376 families residing in the town. The racial makeup of the town was 34.41% White  [24.48% white in 2010] 64.71% African American, [71.02 Black in 2010] 0.07% Asian, 0.20% from other races, and 0.61% from two or more races. Hispanic or Latino of any race were 1.96% of the population.

There were 536 households, out of which 37.3% had children under the age of 18 living with them, 34.5% were married couples living together, 30.0% had a female householder with no husband present, and 29.7% were non-families. 26.9% of all households were made up of individuals, and 11.9% had someone living alone who was 65 years of age or older. The average household size was 2.63 and the average family size was 3.19.

In the town, the population was spread out, with 32.0% under the age of 18, 7.8% from 18 to 24, 23.8% from 25 to 44, 19.6% from 45 to 64, and 16.9% who were 65 years of age or older. The median age was 35 years. For every 100 females, there were 80.5 males. For every 100 females age 18 and over, there were 72.0 males.

The median income for a household in the town was $17,457, and the median income for a family was $21,029. Males had a median income of $23,333 versus $14,519 for females. The per capita income for the town was $9,365. About 33.8% of families and 38.4% of the population were below the poverty line, including 48.9% of those under age 18 and 31.9% of those age 65 or over.

Notable people
Andrew F. Brimmer (1926-2012), economist and first African American to serve as governor of the Federal Reserve System who was born in Newellton
Sarah Dorsey, author, historian, and benefactor of Jefferson Davis, lived at the Routh Plantation near Newellton in the early 1850s.
Emmitt Douglas, president of the Louisiana NAACP from 1966 until his death in 1981.
C.B. Forgotston (born in Newellton in 1945; died 2016) was a lawyer in Hammond and a state government watchdog and political activist. Forgotston graduated from Newellton High School in 1962. He was a frequent guest on The Moon Griffon Show radio talk program.
Clyde V. Ratcliff (1879-1952), member of the Louisiana State Senate from 1944 to 1948; planter in Newellton
Thomas M. Wade (1860-1929), member of Louisiana House of Representatives from 1888 to 1904, Louisiana State Board of Education, and Tensas Parish School Board; Tensas school superintendent for some twenty years after 1904
Leon "Pee Wee" Whittaker, African American trombonist, was born near Newellton.

Gallery

References

Further reading
"John ... and Edward Newell", A Dictionary of Louisiana Biography, Vol. 2 (1988), p. 600

External links
 Newellton Progress Community Progress Site for Newellton, LA
 http://www.thenewsstar.com/apps/pbcs.dll/article?AID=/20060520/NEWS01/605200312/1002
 http://newelltonla.com/

Towns in Louisiana
Towns in Tensas Parish, Louisiana